The 2015 Gibraltar Darts Trophy was the second of nine PDC European Tour events on the 2015 PDC Pro Tour. The tournament took place at the Victoria Stadium, Gibraltar, between 20–22 March 2015. It featured a field of 48 players and £115,000 in prize money, with £25,000 going to the winner.

The defending champion was James Wade, having beaten Steve Beaton 6–4 in the previous year's final, but he was defeated in the semi-finals after losing 6–2 to Terry Jenkins, who then lost the final 6–3 to Michael van Gerwen.

Prize money
The prize fund was increased to £115,000 after being £100,000 for the previous two years.

Qualification and format

The top 16 players from the PDC ProTour Order of Merit on the 16 January 2015 automatically qualified for the event. The remaining 32 places went to players from three qualifying events - 20 from the UK Qualifier (held in Wigan on 18 January), eight from the European Qualifier (held in Bielefeld on 24 January) and four from the Host Nation Qualifier (held at the venue the day before the event started).

The following players took part in the tournament:

Top 16
  Gary Anderson (third round)
  Michael van Gerwen (winner)
  Michael Smith (second round)
  Peter Wright (second round)
  James Wade (semi-finals)
  Robert Thornton (second round)
  Brendan Dolan (second round)
  Mervyn King (quarter-finals)
  Justin Pipe (third round)
  Ian White (second round)
  Simon Whitlock (third round)
  Vincent van der Voort (third round)
  Kim Huybrechts (quarter-finals)
  Stephen Bunting (second round)
  Steve Beaton (second round)
  Terry Jenkins (runner-up)

UK Qualifier 
  Kevin McDine (second round)
  Andy Jenkins (first round)
  Nathan Derry (third round)
  Brian Woods (third round)
  Wes Newton (first round)
  Brett Claydon (first round)
  Andrew Gilding (first round)
  Kevin Painter (second round)
  Joe Murnan (first round)
  Andy Smith (third round)
  Jamie Lewis (semi-finals)
  Mark Webster (first round)
  Steve West (first round)
  Gerwyn Price (quarter-finals)
  Devon Petersen (second round)
  Kurt Parry (first round)
  Daryl Gurney (first round)
  Wayne Jones (third round)
  Tony Newell (second round)
  Andy Parsons (first round)

European Qualifier
  Rowby-John Rodriguez (first round)
  Benito van de Pas (second round)
  Dirk van Duijvenbode (first round)
  Ronny Huybrechts (first round)
  Cristo Reyes (second round)
  Dimitri Van den Bergh (second round)
  Jelle Klaasen (quarter-finals)
  Mike Zuydwijk (second round)

Host Nation Qualifier
  Manuel Vilerio (first round)
  Dylan Duo (first round)
  Antony Lopez (second round)
  John Duo (first round)

Draw

References

2015 PDC European Tour
2015 in Gibraltarian sport
Darts in Gibraltar